Cross Border Xpress (CBX), historically also called the Tijuana Cross-border Terminal and the Puerta de las Californias, is an airport terminal located in the Otay Mesa area of southern San Diego, California, United States, with an access bridge connecting it to the Tijuana International Airport in Tijuana, Baja California, Mexico. It opened on December 9, 2015. It makes Tijuana Airport a geographically binational airport. Unlike the binational airports serving the Swiss cities of Basel (entirely on French territory) and Geneva (entirely on Swiss territory), the CBX terminal is physically located in the United States but serves an airport whose main terminal and runways are in Mexico. A pedestrian bridge spans the United States–Mexico border and Via de la Juventud Oriente in Tijuana, connecting passenger terminals between the two countries. It was the creation of Ralph Nieders, who introduced the concept and infrastructure design in Mexico City in 1989 and San Diego in 1990. The structural scheme allows passengers originating in, and destined to the United States direct access to the Tijuana airport and equally gives Mexican and international carriers operating from the Tijuana airport direct access to the U.S. passenger market.

The terminal, in the Otay Mesa neighborhood of San Diego, allows passengers to check in on the U.S. side of the U.S.–Mexico border, cross a  pedestrian/passenger bridge across the border, clear Mexican immigration and customs, and board flights at the Tijuana International Airport. Passengers arriving in Tijuana are equally able to cross the pedestrian/passenger bridge into the Otay Mesa passenger terminal, clear U.S. passport controls and U.S. Customs, and exit on the U.S. side.

Ownership
CBX is operated by Otay-Tijuana Venture L.L.C., a US-Mexican group of companies with investors that include PAP Corp, PALAREO Inc., EGI-OTAY Investors with financing from Invex and Bancomext.

Facilities and operation

CBX consists of:
 Bridge: a  pedestrian bridge from Mexico to the U.S. The fee to use the bridge is $16 one-way or $30 round-trip. Flight crew that want to use the facility must hold a boarding pass and pay the fee alike. The pedestrian bridge is for the exclusive use of passengers with boarding passes flying into or out of TIJ. Departing passengers may use the facility up to 24 hours prior to the flight's departure time. Arriving passengers are required to cross the bridge into the U.S. within two hours of disembarking the flight.
 Facilities on the U.S. side: Ticket counters and kiosks for the bridge, airline check-in kiosks, and entrance to/exit from the bridge. U.S. customs and immigration inspection facilities, car rental and bus agencies, a snack bar, and a duty-free shop. It is only as a check-in and processing facility for departing and arriving passengers. It has its own parking, check-in stations, and customs offices, but no gates or arrival facilities (thus functionally resembling Hong Kong International Airport's Terminal 2).  There are almost 900 public parking spaces, and areas for passenger pick-up, taxis, and intercity and local buses.
 Facilities on the Mexican side: Mexican immigration and customs. Access to CBX from Mexico is from the baggage claim area, where there are counters to purchase CBX tickets.

Within seven months of the facility's opening, 600,000 passengers had used the facility, with a single day record of 5,800 passengers.

History

The first discussion of a cross-border terminal was part of a proposal initiated by Mexico's Minister of Public Works (Secretario de Obras Publicas) Gilberto Valenzuela Ezquerro who under Mexico's President Gustavo Díaz Ordaz (1964–1970) was directed to modernize Mexico's airports and transportation system. In 1965, Gilberto Valenzuela approached then Mayor of San Diego Frank Curran with a proposal to jointly develop a Tijuana-San Diego airport on Otay Mesa, but at the time, San Diego considered Otay Mesa too remote. Gilberto Valenzuela Ezquerro then initiated the development of the Tijuana airport which was expanded from 128 hectares (316 acres) to 448 hectares (1107 acres) to accommodate  a new terminal and runway.

From 1965 until 1987, the concept of a cross-border terminal lay dormant until Dennis Conner America's Cup victory in Australia. Freddie Laker, who had pioneered low-fare commercial transatlantic routes and was the founder of Laker Airways, became interested in developing international commercial/charter flights through Mexico to service the projected passenger traffic for the America's Cup challenge in San Diego. He met with Rodolfo Ramos Ortiz, who had introduced charter operations in Mexico in the 1970s and founded Aerounión and Aerocharter de México, S.A. de C.V. Negotiations failed but the concept of a cross-border terminal continued to evolve.

In 1989, Ralph Nieders, who had been involved in the Freddie Laker discussions, made a formal proposal to Mexicana de Aviación, S.A. de C.V. in Mexico City. The proposal was accepted and a letter of intent drawn in 1990 for the acquisition of Martinez Ranch (parcel number APN 667-050-07) as the designated site for the cross-border terminal. The Mexicana de Aviación/Nieders image 1 shown in this section became the first of a series of plans/diagrams that were created to better promote the project. Contact was then made with the San Diego Association of Governments (SANDAG) whose plans for a "bi-national airport" had been undermined in November 1989, when the San Diego City Council lifted a building moratorium on Otay Mesa. SANDAG did not support the development of a cross-border terminal as it sought to again revive its efforts to create a bi-national airport on San Diego's Otay Mesa and Mexicana de Aviación opted not to pursue the project in January, 1991. As Mexicana de Aviación withdrew, in February 1991, Rodolfo Ramos Ortiz/Aerocharter de México looking at the Tijuana airport's potential for passenger and cargo operations to Japan and other Pacific destinations joined Ralph Nieders to continue promoting the cross-border terminal. As shown by image 2, an updated rendering was then created showing a fully developed Tijuana airport and how its cargo and passengers would directly connect to San Diego's surface streets and freeway system.

In 1993, San Diego's efforts to develop a regional bi-national airport failed   and a recession during that same period also caused the collapsed of land values in Otay Mesa. The selected site for the Aerocharter cross-border terminal on the U.S. side was foreclosed. Efforts to build the cross-border terminal were then suspended.

In 1994, Mexico initiated its airport privatization program and the cross-border terminal was refloated by Gilberto Valenzuela Ezquerro and Ralph Nieders. The Tijuana airport became part of the Pacific Airport Group, known as GAP (Grupo Aeroportuario del Pacífico) consisting of 12 airports with 15 Million Annual Passengers  and headquartered in Guadalajara. In 1999, a Spanish consortium won the concession and committed to developing the cross-border terminal but in August  2001, in an effort to reduce operating costs, canceled the project and Ralph Nieders resigned as GAP's cross-border project manager.  The Tijuana cross-border terminal project then reverted to Mexico's airport authority Aeropuertos y Servicios Auxiliares (ASA) and was privately promoted by  Gilberto Valenzuela and Ralph Nieders.
 
In 2006, Controladora Mexicana de Aeropuertos S.A. de C.V. headed by Eduardo Sanchez-Navarro Redo, Carlos Laviada Ocejo and his wife Laura Diez-Barroso Azcarraga replaced Holdinmex S.A. de C.V. as the Mexican strategic partner within AMP (Aeropuertos Mexicanos del Pacifico, S.A. de C.V.) and assumed control of the Pacific Airport Group (GAP). Gilberto Valenzuela Ezquerro contacted Eduardo Sanchez-Navarro Redo and arrangements were made for Christian Checa Levien, son-in-law of Laura Diez-Barroso Azcarraga de Laviada, to meet with Ralph Nieders to discuss the development of a cross-border terminal and land options. A private tour and meeting at the San Diego International Airport was then arranged between Christian Checa and Ralph Nieders by Theodore Sexton of the San Diego Regional Airport Authority. The three potential crossing sites Martinez Ranch, Britannia Commerce Center and Martinez Trust were discussed. The cross-border terminal then became part of the strategic development of the Tijuana airport. Land negotiations on Martinez Trust as well as Britannia Commerce Center failed. Samuel Zell of Equity International then became interested and his representative David Contis met with Christian Checa and Ralph Nieders. Land negotiations on Martinez Trust then followed and in 2007 negotiations on parcel APN 667-060-02 (Martinez Trust) were successfully completed. Otay-Tijuana Venture LLC was then created to develop and operate the Tijuana cross-border terminal.

After a quarter century of negotiations and planning for a cross-border terminal, construction began at the Tijuana airport in October 2013 and work on the U.S. side began in June 2014. The cross-border terminal was completed in December 2015. The project had an initial estimated cost of $78 million US dollars and a final completion cost of $120 million US dollars, funded by Mexican and U.S. private investors and Grupo Aeroportuario del Pacífico. Building E of Tijuana's Terminal 1 was retrofitted to support the new bridge structure on the Mexican side. During the construction phase, a temporary border waiver between the U.S. and Mexico had to be issued by mutual legislation to allow U.S. construction cranes and U.S. fabricated steel bridge structural sections to cross the U.S.-Mexico boundary and be set over the six-lane Mexican Federal Highway 2.

The main contractor for the terminal was Turner Construction Company. The civil engineer was Latitude 33 Planning and Engineering. Structural engineers were Hope Amundson Structural Engineers and Kleinfelder. The electrical subcontractor was Bergelectric. The mechanical and plumbing subcontractor was Industrial Commercial Systems. The site work and management subcontractor was Hazard Construction Company. Stantec Incorporated based in Alberta, Canada, was selected as the prime architect and facility designer with the late Ricardo Legorreta of Legorreta+Legorreta as the associate architect.

The Tijuana cross-border terminal was renamed the Cross Border Xpress (CBX) and opened to passenger service on December 9, 2015. However, the official opening ceremony did not take place until April 7, 2016.

For its design and innovation in the category of Airport and Ports, in April 2016 Engineering News-Report (ENR) gave the Otay-Tijuana Cross Border Xpress (CBX) its Global Award For Merit. and in September 2016, awarded CBX the Airports/Transit Best Project in California.

In 2020, an additional restroom facility was added to the building and the duty-free area underwent a renovation completed by Delawie Architects and Turner Construction Company.

Gallery

References

Mexico–United States border crossings
Airports in Baja California
Airports in San Diego
Binational airports
Buildings and structures in Tijuana
Ricardo Legorreta buildings
2015 establishments in California
2015 establishments in Mexico
Buildings and structures completed in 2015
Tijuana Airport